Neolitsea fuscata is a species of tree in the family Lauraceae. It is endemic to the Sri Lanka. The name is still in debate to accept as a separate species.

References

 Isoboldine and lupenone from Neolitsea fuscata.
 jstor.org

fuscata
Endemic flora of Sri Lanka